Receptor-type tyrosine-protein phosphatase N2 (R-PTP-N2) also known as islet cell autoantigen-related protein (ICAAR) and phogrin is an enzyme that in humans is encoded by the PTPRN2 gene. PTPRN and PTPRN2 (this gene) are both found to be major autoantigens associated with insulin-dependent diabetes mellitus.

Function 

Due to a close similarity in the gene sequences, the protein encoded by this gene has traditionally been considered a member of the protein tyrosine phosphatase (PTP) family. PTPs are known to be signaling molecules that regulate a variety of cellular processes including cell growth, differentiation, mitotic cycle, and oncogenic transformation. However, recent research has shown that the PTPRN2 mouse homolog, known as phogrin, dephosphorylates the lipid phosphatidylinositol rather than tyrosine. Specifically, phogrin was shown to act upon phosphatidylinositol 3-phosphate and Phosphatidylinositol 4,5-diphosphate, whereas it has never been observed acting upon tyrosine. PTPRN2 should, therefore, be more accurately considered a PIPase rather than a PTPase. Phosphorylated forms of phosphatidylinositol (PI) are called phosphoinositides and play important roles in lipid signaling, cell signaling and membrane trafficking.

The protein produced by PTPRN2 possesses an extracellular region, a single transmembrane region, and a single intracellular catalytic domain, and thus represents a receptor-type PTP. The catalytic domain of this PTP is most closely related to PTPRN, also known as IA-2.

Gene 

Three alternatively spliced transcript variants of this gene, which encode distinct proteins, have been reported.

Interactions 

PTPRN2 has been shown to interact with: CKAP5, SPTBN4, and UBQLN4.

Clinical significance 

R-PTP-N2 functions as an autoantigen in diabetes mellitus type 1.

References

Further reading